Just Checking by Emily Colas is an account of her experience with obsessive-compulsive disorder. Divided into four sections, Colas provides snapshots of her life in a journal like manner. The text conveys her emotions regarding the disease throughout her entire life including her childhood and her role as a mother herself.

Overview

Just Checking: scenes from the life of an obsessive-compulsive was written by Emily Colas in the year 1998. Separated into four parts, Emily Colas provides snapshots of her daily life and the struggles that she faces as a result of her disorder: obsessive-compulsive disorder. The anecdotes of her life are written in a journal-like manner. The entries cover all aspects of her life from her cheating college boyfriend, to her family life and raising her two children, and to her interaction with friends. Throughout all of the excerpts Emily Cola’s frantic worries are evident, especially her constant fear of contracting diseases from the most common daily interactions with other humans. Colas’ most evident worry is that she will instantaneously contract a disease from the most minuscule sample of blood. When strangers, including the babysitter of her children, enter her home she becomes obsessed with every possible chance that they may infect her home. Therefore, Colas’ developed a system of checkpoints so she could determine whether or not the bathroom was used, a drawer opened, or anything touched. As the book proceeds the narrator begins to deal with her illness and she struggles to get better. Her marriage fell apart as a result of her disorder and she and her husband divorced. Eventually, after Colas’ married life disintegrated, she decided to take action and get help for her disorder. The narrative covers the stress that her condition placed on her family. A family member's negative response to the person's disorder can increase the OCD behavior. Colas started taking medication and made the conscious effort to stop obsessing over unimportant matters. The last section of entries demonstrates a healthier and more controlled person and the reader sees a change in the narrator.

OCD in college students
In her narrative, Emily Colas covers her time as an obsessive-compulsive college student. She writes that she had a bad habit of using drugs. She was a consistent user until one evening she had a terrible experience. She decided that drugs were not for her and she felt that God had chosen another path for her. Once she stopped using drugs she developed "extreme and intrusive neurotic thoughts." Colas' condition is not uncommon in college students. OCD affects 5 of every 1,000 students. Obsessive-compulsive disorder is a biological anxiety disorder that causes a person to obsess over worries or fears and perform rituals in order to satisfy the worries. For many people Obsessive-Compulsive Disorder first surfaces during their college career. This is because individuals with the disorder may have had more control over their condition while living at home with a family. Symptoms may not have interfered with the person's life or the person may have merely been labeled a perfectionist. Stress and adjusting to a new environment does not cause OCD, it does however provide an opportunity for symptoms to emerge. Emily Colas writes of the difficulty she faced in college due to her disorder. She struggled socially, as she began dating. Colas had developed a fear of eating at restaurants because she worried she would be poisoned. Fears like this are common among people with OCD. There are many different steps a college student can take to deal with their disorder. University health centers are available on most campuses and help can be provided to those who think they may have OCD. Cognitive behavioral therapy accompanied by medication is the most common treatment for the disorder. Cognitive behavior therapists work with OCD patients to overcome their fears by talking them through the process of facing their fears. This method of treatment has proven to be the most effective. Although this method is extremely effective, patients should also stay away from certain over-the-counter drugs and caffeine. Meditation is also a healthy choice because it has a calming effect. Colas' condition was not uncommon for college students and today there are several places for students to go to get help.

Compulsions
Those with obsessive-compulsive disorder continually practice rituals or routines in order to satisfy their intrusive worries and fears. Emily Colas describes several routines that she completes daily in order to ensure that she does not contract a disease. Colas has a rather complex routine for taking out the garbage. She had her husband undergo an extensive procedure of taking out the trash to ensure that no germs entered her home. Colas also had a habit of double checking things. When putting on the dishwasher she would check several times to be certain that her cats were not inside the appliance. Eventually she started locking the cats in the bathroom when it was time to wash the dishes. Routines like Colas' are typical of OCD patients. These routines are meant to satisfy their worries and make the person feel better temporarily. Often the patients feel compelled to perform these rituals. A person's worries generally fit into three categories: overestimation of threat, intolerance of uncertainty, and the over-importance of one's thoughts and the desire to control these thoughts. Common rituals or routines of OCD patients include excessive cleaning, checking locks, ordering or arranging items in a certain way, and saving or sometimes hoarding items. These routines are exhausting for the person to keep up with and they only satisfy their worries temporarily.

Narrative medicine
Just Checking fits into the literary genre of narrative medicine. Rita Charon describes Narrative Medicine as "medicine practiced with the narrative competence to recognize, absorb, interpret, and be moved by the stories of illness." The purpose of narrative medicine is to add a more meaningful component to sickness and disease. Emily Colas' literary work is an illness narrative because Colas describes her disorder with emotion. She covers all aspects of her life in regards to the disease through her narrative. She acknowledges the illness and releases her feelings towards her dysfunctional condition. Colas' narrative provides an outlet for her to discuss her disorder and reflect on her journey to recovery.

References

External links
http://familydoctor.org/online/famdocen/home/common/mentalhealth/anxiety/133.html
https://archive.today/20130415141032/http://www.ocdchicago.org/index.php/college/
http://www.nimh.nih.gov/health/topics/obsessive-compulsive-disorder-ocd/index.shtml

1998 non-fiction books
Obsessive–compulsive disorder in non-fiction literature